Ackerman Creek is a stream located in the U.S. state of California. It is located in Mendocino County. 

Ackerman Creek (Ya-mo bida - wind hole creek) runs through the Pinoleville Reservation in Mendocino County, and is of biocultural significance to the Pomo tribe of Native Americans. Ackerman Creek is central to Pinoleville Pomo cultural subsistence practices, as it is a source of water for the nation's sweat lodge, supports a salmon population, and its native vegetation is used in a variety of cultural practices including basketry. 

The Pinoleville Pomo Nation currently has restoration efforts underway to remove invasive species, propagate native species including steelhead, and conduct ongoing monitoring of ground water, surface water, vegetation, macroinvertebrates, fish, and birds.

Course
Ackerman Creek rises about 2 miles northwest of Mann Ranch, California, in Mendocino County and then flows generally east to join the Russian River about 1 mile north of Ukiah.

Watershed
Ackerman Creek drains  of area, receives about 49.4 in/year of precipitation, has a wetness index of 268.37, and is about 49% forested.

References

Rivers of Northern California
Rivers of Mendocino County, California